is a railway station  in Sakai, in the town of Fujimi Town, Suwa District, Nagano Prefecture, Japan, operated by East Japan Railway Company (JR East).

Lines
Suzurannosato Station is served by the Chūō Main Line and is 186.1 kilometers from the terminus of the line at Tokyo Station.

Station layout
Suzurannosato Station has two unnumbered opposed side platforms built on an embankment. The platforms are connected by an underpass. The station is not attended.

Platforms

History
The station opened on 31 October 1985. With the privatization of Japanese National Railways (JNR) on 1 April 1987, the station came under the control of JR East.

Surrounding area

See also
 List of railway stations in Japan

References

External links

  

Railway stations in Nagano Prefecture
Chūō Main Line
Railway stations in Japan opened in 1985
Stations of East Japan Railway Company
Fujimi, Nagano